The Berkshire Block is located in Superior, Wisconsin.

History
The building originally housed a bank, followed by department stores and insurance company. Currently, it serves as the headquarters for Amsoil.

References

Bank buildings on the National Register of Historic Places in Wisconsin
Department stores on the National Register of Historic Places
National Register of Historic Places in Douglas County, Wisconsin
Richardsonian Romanesque architecture in Wisconsin
Brick buildings and structures
Limestone buildings in the United States
Commercial buildings completed in 1892